Vadhayiyaan Ji Vadhayiyaan (English: Congratulations, yes congratulations) is a 2018 Punjabi film directed by Smeep Kang starring Binnu Dhillon & Kavita Kaushik in lead roles.

Cast
 Binnu Dhillon as Pargat
 Kavita Kaushik as Gagan 
 Jaswinder Bhalla as Bhullar (Gagan's Father)
 Gurpreet Ghuggi as Sukhi 
 Karamjit Anmol as Honey 
 B.N. Sharma as Pargat's Father

Soundtrack

Track listing

Release

Film was released worldwide on 13 July 2018 distributed by Omjee Group.

References

Indian romantic comedy films
Punjabi-language Indian films
2010s Punjabi-language films
Films scored by Jatinder Shah
2018 romantic comedy films